is a 1983 Japanese superhero kaiju parody fan film directed by Hideaki Anno in his directorial debut.

Cast 

 Hideaki Anno as Ultraman (here, the character is referencing Ultraman Jack)
 Norio Tamura as Kiruan
 Yasuhiro Takeda as Captain Ibuki
 Joiichi Hayashi as Hayakawa
 Takeshi Sawamura as Ibuki
 Takashi Nyoten as Yamaga
 Nishigaki Toshihiko as Imamura
 Yuki Nishi as Nishi
 Norio Tamura as Kiruan
 Kifumi Seizumi as the narrator

Release 
Hideaki Anno attended a screening of the film in Tokyo in 1983, where he met his future friend and collaborator Shinji Higuchi for the first time. They would later collaborate on Shin Ultraman with Anno returning to the title role. The film is set to be screened at Shinjuku Wald 9 on July 1, 2022 to commemorate the theater's 15th anniversary and the success of Shin Ultraman.

Notes

References

External links 

 

1983 films
Fan films
Ultraman
Tokusatsu films
1980s parody films
Films directed by Hideaki Anno
Gainax
Tsuburaya Productions
Kaiju films
Japanese science fiction comedy films
1980s Japanese films